Bewdley is a town in Worcestershire, England.

Bewdley may also refer to:

Bewdley, Ontario, Canada
Bewdley (St. Stephens Church, Virginia), United States, a plantation
Bewdley (UK Parliament constituency), a former constituency in Worcestershire, England